Julio César González Hernández (born December 25, 1952) is a former Major League Baseball infielder. He played all or part of seven seasons in the majors from  until . He played about equally at shortstop and second base, with a lesser but still substantial number of games at third base. He was traded from the Chicago Cubs to the Houston Astros for Greg Gross at the Winter Meetings on December 8, .

References

Sources

1952 births
Living people
People from Caguas, Puerto Rico
Major League Baseball second basemen
Major League Baseball shortstops
Houston Astros players
St. Louis Cardinals players
Detroit Tigers players
Quincy Cubs players
Key West Conchs players
Midland Cubs players
Wichita Aeros players
Charleston Charlies players
Tucson Toros players
Evansville Triplets players
Major League Baseball players from Puerto Rico